Govert Schilling (born 30 November 1956) is a Dutch popular science writer and amateur astronomer.

Career 

Schilling was born in Meerkerk.  In 1982, he became the program leader at the former Zeiss Planetarium, Amsterdam.

From 1987 to 1998 he was also a part-time appointee as a program leader at the Artis Planetarium in Amsterdam.

He has extensively written for the Sky & Telescope magazine and Science.

Honours 

The asteroid 10986 Govert is named after him.

Bibliography 

He is the author of a number of bestselling books.

He has frequently collaborated with Lars Lindberg Christensen.

 Europe to the Stars: ESO's first 50 years of exploring the southern sky
 Atlas of Astronomical Discoveries
 Evolving Cosmos
 Eyes on the Skies: 400 Years of Telescopic Discovery
 The Hunt for Planet X: New Worlds and the Fate of Pluto  ISBN 978-0-387-77804-4
 Flash!: The Hunt for the Biggest Explosions in the Universe
 Ripples in Spacetime: Einstein, Gravitational Waves and the Future of Astronomy

References

External links 
 http://allesoversterrenkunde.nl/#!/english/govert-schilling/
 https://twitter.com/govertschilling
 http://www.linkedin.com/in/govertschilling

Living people
Dutch science writers
1956 births
People from Zederik